Lloyd Binch (28 March 1931 – 15 December 2016) was a British cyclist.

Career
He competed in the sprint event at the 1960 Summer Olympics. He also represented England and won a bronze medal in the 1,000m match sprint at the 1958 British Empire and Commonwealth Games in Cardiff, Wales.

Binch was a seven times British track champion, winning the British National Individual Sprint Championships from 1955 until 1961.

References

External links
 

1931 births
2016 deaths
British male cyclists
Olympic cyclists of Great Britain
Cyclists at the 1960 Summer Olympics
People from Kimberley, Nottinghamshire
Sportspeople from Nottinghamshire
Commonwealth Games medallists in cycling
Commonwealth Games bronze medallists for England
Cyclists at the 1958 British Empire and Commonwealth Games
Medallists at the 1958 British Empire and Commonwealth Games